In February 2019, massive forest fires broke out in numerous places across the Bandipur National Park of the Karnataka state in India. The National Remote Sensing Centre of the Indian Space Research Organisation (ISRO) carried out an assessment of the total area affected by the fire. On 25 February 2019, it estimated the extent of burnt area to be about 10,920 acres in the last five days since 21 February 2019.

Though the major fire was brought under control by 24 February 2019, some areas continued to burn. The fire also spread to Mudumalai forest range in Tamil Nadu, causing damage in around 40 acres. The Tamil Nadu forest department took action to ensure that it did not spread further.

Background 
On 21 February 2019, wildfire broke out in the Bandipur Tiger Reserve. Unlike in previous years, this is the first time the wildfire in Bandipur flared up earlier due to the sudden climatic change and rapid growth of dry grass and Lantana. Officials reported that there appeared to have been no deaths of the larger mammals in the Park, such as bison, elephants, leopard and tiger.

Over 10,000 acres of forest in Bandipur area was destroyed. With the fire spreading rapidly due to winds, the authorities closed the Gundlupet-Ooty National highway and safaris in Bandipur National Park were also cancelled. Strong winds were making the job of firefighters, forest staff and volunteers more difficult.

The fire that destroyed Kundakere Range, spread to Barakatte and Guddakere, then to the Himavathi Gopalaswamy Hills. It also destroyed forests in Jarkal Kere and Gowri Kalu hills. Many smaller mammals and reptiles were killed, along with thousands of trees. There had been no forest-fire incidents noted in Bandipur National Park in the previous two years.

Firefighting

Two Mi-17 Indian Air Force helicopters were deployed on 25 February 2019 afternoon to douse the fire, which had been raging for three days in the Bandipur Tiger Reserve. The operation on 25 February 2019 was primarily limited to the Gopalaswamy Hills Range in Karnataka's Chamarajanagar district. The other two ranges that were seriously affected were Kundakere and Bandipur. The helicopters were deployed after Karnataka state Chief Minister HD Kumaraswamy called on the Indian Air Force for help. One proceeded towards Karadikal hill ranges while the other fought fires in the general area of Chammana halla top.

Bolagudda and Kanive temple area were also subject to helicopter fire control A total of 10 sorties were flown, dropping approximately 30,000 litres of water.

Damage assessment

Satellite images shown the extent of the damage caused by the wildfire. The National Remote Sensing Centre of the Indian Space Research Organisation (ISRO), Hyderabad, released a report based on Sentinel-2 satellite data, which reported that 15,443.27 acres of forest area damaged by the fire between 23 February 2019 and 25 February 2019 in Bandipur forest region alone. Nature Conservation Foundation's Wildlife Scientist Mysore Doreswamy Madhusudan estimated that 17,000 acres would have been affected since the National Remote Sensing Centre excluded the damage in administratively part of Bandipur (Revenue land).

Number of casualties due to fire has not estimated yet. Wildlife officials say that small animals, reptiles, which are slow-moving, would have borne the brunt, while bigger mammals like leopards and tigers would have fled to the Bandipur Tiger Reserve and taken refuge in nearby areas.

Investigation 
Karnataka's top forest official confirmed that an "act of sabotage" had caused the blaze. Forest officials have arrested two shepherds for allegedly setting fire to the forest. Fearing tiger attacks on their cattle in Bandipur, on 22 February 2019 they had sparked the fire to chase away a tiger which was spotted in the area for a month or so, leading to massive fire, which destroyed thousands of acres of Bandipur forest area. The accused were booked under Indian section 27, 29, 30, 31, 40 , 50 and 51 of the Wildlife Protection Act, 1972.
Many people say that the forest officials were correct to arrest them

Gallery

See also 
 List of wildfires
 2016 Uttarakhand forest fires

References

External links

2019 disasters in India
2019 wildfires
February 2019 events in India
Fires in India
Disasters in Karnataka
Natural disasters in India
Chamarajanagar district
2010s in Karnataka
Wildfires in India
2019 fires in Asia